Sångsällskapet Orphei Drängar (OD) is a Swedish male voice choir and singing society based in Uppsala, Sweden. While best known for its high quality performances of the classical repertoire, OD sings music of all genres in many different languages and since the start in 1853 has been widely acknowledged for its ambition to continuously push the envelope of what a male-voice choir can and should do.

Since 2008, the choir has been conducted by Cecilia Rydinger, in close cooperation with deputy conductor Folke Alin.

History 
Orphei Drängar was founded on October 30th 1853 while the city of Uppsala was isolated in an attempt to stop the spread of the cholera epidemic that was then tormenting Sweden. The blockade was successful in that the city more or less came to be spared from the disease, but also had the effect that the students instead felt that they were about to die of boredom. In an attempt to remedy this, first tenor Jonas Widén gathered twelve students (ten singers, a pianist and a spectator) and the conductor Oscar Arpi in a local Banquet Hall, where they passed the time singing together. One of the songs that was performed was Fredman's Epistle No. 14, "Hör, I Orphei Drängar" ("Hear, ye sons of Orpheus") by Carl Michael Bellman, and before the evening was over the singing friends (including the spectator) had formed the Orphei Drängar singing society.

The ambitions rose, as composer Jacob Axel Josephson, since 1849 director musices at the Uppsala university, was recruited as the director of the choir in 1854. The first public performance under the choir's own name took place in 1864, and a yearly tradition with spring concerts started in 1870. OD was by that time an established elite choir, that also performed in Stockholm and in Gothenburg. During the latter half of the 19th century, the choir went on tours abroad to Paris (1867, 1878, 1900), Berlin (1898) and has over the years been performing to audiences in many different parts of the world.

Orphei Drängar made its first recording during a tour to London in 1907 and performed at the Olympic Games in Paris 1924.

Choir 
In the 21st century, Orphei Drängar consists of approximately 80 singers. Admission tests are usually carried out in the beginning of September each year.Yearly recurring concerts are the spring concert in April, the traditional spring song on April 30th, with the Caprice concerts in December.

List of conductors 
1853 – 1854, Oscar Arpi
1854 – 1880, Jacob Axel Josephson
1880 – 1909, Ivar Eggert Hedenblad
1909 – 1910, Wilhelm Lundgren
1910 – 1947, Hugo Alfvén
1947 – 1951, Carl Godin
1951 – 1985, Eric Ericson
1985 – 1991, Eric Ericson and Robert Sund (shared conductorship)
1991 – 2008, Robert Sund
2008 – Present, Cecilia Rydinger Alin

Discography 
1991 – Christmas Music
1992 – Oedipus Rex
1993 – OD sings Alfvén
1996 – The Singing Apes
1997 – Våren är kommen
1999 – Capricer med OD, part 1 (1964–1969)
2000 – Schubert: Male Choruses
2001 – Capricer med OD, part 2 (1970–1975)
2002 – Capricer med OD, part 3 (1976–1981)
2003 – Diamonds
2003 – Capricer med OD, part 4 (1982–1986)
2004 – Capricer med OD, part 5 (1987–1990)
2005 – OD Antiqua
2006 – Sounds of Sund
2007 – Capricer med OD, part 6 (1991–1995)
2009 – Capricer med OD, part 7 (1996–1999)
2009 – Capricer med OD, part 8 (2000–2002)
2009 – Christmas Songs
2011 – Capricer med OD, part 9 (2003 - 2005)
2012 – Orphei Drängar
2012 – Curse Upon Iron
2013 – De Profundis
2013 – Capricer med OD, part 10 (2006 - 2008)
2016 – The Greatest Videogame Music III – Choral Edition, together with Myrra Malmberg, produced by X5 Music Group

Notes

References

External links
 Website

Swedish choirs
Student societies in Sweden
Uppsala University
1853 establishments in Sweden
Organizations established in 1853
Musical groups established in the 1850s
Musical groups from Uppsala